Center Hill is an unincorporated community in Carroll County, Illinois, United States. Center Hill is located on U.S. Route 52 and Illinois Route 64, between Savanna and Mount Carroll.

References

Unincorporated communities in Carroll County, Illinois
Unincorporated communities in Illinois